The Piltdown Men were an American rock and roll  instrumental studio group from Hollywood, California, United States, featuring two lead saxophones.

They were the brainchild of Ed Cobb and pianist Lincoln Mayorga of the Four Preps, and their records were issued on the Capitol label. Their name was inspired by the Piltdown Man hoax. In 1960, their tune "Brontosaurus Stomp", featuring saxophonists Scott Gordon and Jackie Kelso, guitarist Bob Bain, bassist Tommy Tedesco, drummer Alan Brenmanen, and Mayorga on piano, reached No. 75 on the Billboard Hot 100. Helped in large part by The Flintstones premiering that same year.

They were most successful in the UK, where their hits were, beginning in 1960, "McDonald's Cave" (based on "Old McDonald Had a Farm", and originally the B-side of "Brontosaurus Stomp"), "Piltdown Rides Again" (based on Rossini's "William Tell Overture"), and (in celebration of the coincidental start of The Flintstones cartoon series on television) "Goodnight Mrs. Flintstone" (based on "Good Night Ladies" by E. P. Christy).  They released no more records after "Night Surfin'" in 1962, produced by Nick Venet.

A compilation LP called The Piltdown Men was released in the Netherlands on Capitol in 1981, and has been reissued several times. A CD compilation album was released on Ace in 1998, entitled The Piltdown Men Ride Again.

Discography

Singles
"Brontosaurus Stomp" (August 1960) - US No. 75
"McDonald's Cave" (1960) - UK No. 14
"Piltdown Rides Again" (September 1960) - UK No. 14
"Goodnight Mrs. Flintstone" (January 1961) - UK No. 18
"Gargantua" (May 1961)
"A Pretty Girl is Like a Melody" (February 1962)
"Night Surfin'" (November 1962)

References

External links
[ The Piltdown Men biography] at the AllMusic website

American instrumental musical groups